Kevin Cooper may refer to:

 Kevin Cooper (prisoner) (born 1958), inmate on death row in California
 Kevin Cooper (footballer) (born 1975), English footballer
 Kevin Cooper (cricketer) (born 1957), English first class cricketer
 Kevin Cooper (lacrosse) (born 1991), American lacrosse player

See also
 Kevon Cooper (born 1989), cricketer from Trinidad and Tobago